Patrick Sweeney (born June 16, 1954) is an American politician and a Republican member of the Wyoming House of Representatives representing District 58 since January 10, 2017.

Elections

2016
Sweeney and Charles Schoenwolf challenged incumbent Representative Tom Reeder in the Republican primary. Sweeney defeated Reeder by 13 votes, winning 44% of the vote. He defeated Democrat Michael McDaniel Jr. and independent candidate Joe Porambo in the general election with 77% of the vote.

References

External links
Official page at the Wyoming Legislature
Profile from Ballotpedia

Living people
Republican Party members of the Wyoming House of Representatives
Politicians from Casper, Wyoming
1954 births
Pennsylvania State University alumni
21st-century American politicians